Jagdish "Panditrao" Agashe (8 March 1936 – 16 November 1986) was an Indian businessman, best remembered for succeeding his father Chandrashekhar Agashe as the joint managing director of the Brihan Maharashtra Sugar Syndicate Ltd. from 1970 to 1978. The Panditrao Agashe School in Pune is named in his honour.

Biography

Early life and family: 1936–1956 
Agashe was born on 8 March 1936, into an aristocratic and entrepreneurial Chitpavan brahmin family of industrialist Chandrashekhar Agashe and wife Indirabai Agashe (née Dwarka Gokhale). He was the fourth of nine children, and second son (eldest surviving), born to his parents. Given the name Jagdish at birth, he was known for most of his professional and personal life as Panditrao, a nickname given to him by his sisters.

Agashe's father founded the Brihan Maharashtra Sugar Syndicate in 1934, and after his death in 1956, Agashe was brought on the board of directors of the company under S. L. Limaye's chairmanship and K. V. Champhekar's management in 1957. He had matriculated high school, but dropped out of his Bachelor of Science degree from Fergusson University when he joined the company, becoming the joint managing director of the syndicate alongside his brother Dnyaneshwar on 1 July 1970.

Agashe never married. Through his brother Dnyaneshwar, he was a paternal uncle to Mandar and Ashutosh Agashe. Some of Agashe's other prominent relations include musician Ashutosh Phatak, historian Dinkar G. Kelkar, scientist P. K. Kelkar, and Third Anglo-Maratha War general Bapu Gokhale.

Career in business: 1956–1986 
Agashe's father left the syndicate to him in a strong position, with several senior managers of the company aiding Agashe, given his considerable youth when he joined the board of directors in 1957. Between 1958 and 1966, the syndicate continued regular operation under the board's management and Agashe's supervision, during which time he financially aided several farming communities around the Malshiras taluka, including those regions affected by the Panshet dam flood in 1961. 

The later half of the 1960s saw Agashe battle the Government of Maharashtra's socialist land acquisition schemes, which he ultimately lost, relinquishing several thousand acres of syndicate owned land to the Government of India. He was also known for his philanthropy, donating to several Maharashtra Mandals across India. By 1966, Agashe's brother Dnyaneshwar had joined him on the board of directors of the syndicate, and further founded the Suvarna Sahakari Bank in 1969, of which Agashe was a director. Agashe became the joint managing director of the company in July 1970.

In the early 1970s, Agashe established the Mandar Printing Press in Shaniwar Peth, naming it after his nephew Mandar. In 1973, he also donated an exhibit named after his father to the Raja Dinkar Kelkar Museum. Beginning in the 1970s, under Agashe and his brother, the syndicate manufactured liquor in Shreepur, Maharashtra, specialising in whisky and rum production under its several flagship brands. The syndicate was one of the first companies to produce a range of government-approved liquors after the Maharashtra state prohibition, called Indian Made Foreign Liquor. In 1978, Agashe retired as joint managing director of the syndicate, leaving his brother as sole managing director. By the early 1980s, under Agashe's management, the syndicate also briefly engaged in the business of metal printing. In 1984, Agashe survived a heart attack, having been a heavy smoker for most of his life.

Death and legacy: 1986 
Agashe died on 16 November 1986, from a heart attack at the family residence in Shaniwar Peth. His younger brother and nephews survived him in business. The Panditrao Agashe School in Pune was named in his honour.

References

Bibliography 

Marathi people
1936 births
1986 deaths
Businesspeople from Pune
Indian industrialists
20th-century Indian businesspeople
20th-century Indian philanthropists
Businesspeople from Maharashtra